The Plagusiidae are a family of crabs, formerly treated as a subfamily of the family Grapsidae, but have since been considered sufficiently distinct to be a family in their own right. The family Plagusiidae includes the subfamily Plagusiinae, comprising the genera Percnon and Plagusia, which constitute a widespread group of litophilic, intertidal and subtidal crabs that are notorious for their speed and their agility.

Six genera are included in the family:
Davusia Guinot, 2007
Euchirograpsus H. Milne-Edwards, 1853
Guinusia Schubart & Cuesta, 2010
Miersiograpsus Türkay, 1978
Percnon Gistel, 1848
Plagusia Latreille, 1804

References

Grapsoidea
Decapod families